Kentucky Colonel is the highest title of honor bestowed by the Commonwealth of Kentucky, and is the most well-known of a number of honorary colonelcies conferred by United States governors. A Kentucky Colonel Commission (the certificate) is awarded in the name of the Commonwealth by the Governor of Kentucky to individuals with "Honorable" titular style recognition preceding the names of civilians aged 18 or over, for noteworthy accomplishments, contributions to civil society, remarkable deeds, or outstanding service to the community, state, or a nation. The Governor bestows the honorable title with a colonelcy commission, by issuance of letters patent. 

While many famous and noteworthy people have received commissions as Kentucky colonels, the award is equally available to those of all backgrounds based on their deeds. A Kentucky Colonel is traditionally considered a goodwill ambassador of the Kentucky state, culture, folklore, traditions and values.

History

From the early 20th century, it was widely believed, at least since the 1930s, "that when the Kentucky Militia was deactivated following the War of 1812, Governor Isaac Shelby commissioned Charles Stewart Todd as one of his officers in the campaign, made him an aide-de-camp on the governor's staff with the rank and grade of colonel in 1813". The story was proven to be a myth based in state folklore from the "Derby Colonels" which was challenged in U.S. Federal Court in 2020, when it was shown  Chas. Stewart Todd was made a captain of U.S. Army infantry in 1813, there he served as aide to General William Henry Harrison in the Battle of the Thames. In 1815, Captain Todd became Inspector-General of the Michigan Territory under General Duncan McArthur who decommissioned him with the retiring rank of colonel before returning to his home in Kentucky. There he met Governor Isaac Shelby's daughter, and subsequently wrote Governor Shelby a letter to ask for Leticia's hand in marriage. Marrying the Governor's daughter garnered him enough influence to become the youngest Secretary of State several months later under the successive Kentucky Governor George Madison.

Civilian honorary officers 
While some early colonels served military roles in the state, colonel in Kentucky was a well-known civilian honorific title belonging to attorneys, judges, county commissioners, large land owners and sheriffs well into 1860. Henry Clay of Fayette County and Cassius Clay of Madison County were both Kentucky colonels. In the latter part of the 19th century, Commonwealth colonelcy took on a more ceremonial function with governors. Colonels in uniform attended functions at the Governor's mansion and stood as symbolic guards at state events. By the late 19th century, the title had become more of an honorary one assigning colonelcy duties to the ceremonial guard and recognizing civilians for their promotion of the prosperity of the state by commuting the Honorable title as an honorary colonel. In 1895, Governor William O'Connell Bradley commissioned the first honorary Kentucky colonels as an award of merit bestowed upon citizens for their individual contributions to the state, good deeds, and noteworthy actions. 

In 1890 Opie Read published a book called A Kentucky Colonel which evolved a new public perception of what a Kentucky colonel was, posing himself more as a refined, well-mannered southern gentleman, rather than a figure in the Kentucky militia. This view was expanded by Zoe Anderson Norris with a series of twelve stories published in The Sun (New York) in 1905 describing scenes and incidents in a Kentucky Colonel's life in the South.

Kentucky colonels became definitively idealized in the Commonwealth in 1889 with the rest of America when the Louisville Post published an article "Kentucky Colonels: How It Happens They are so Numerous In the Blue Grass State" in September 1889, the article was published by more than 80 regional city newspapers defining the Kentucky Colonel. While this may be one of the reasons Governor Bradley made it an official honorific form of address for civilians, it is not close to the end of the history of Kentucky colonelcy. 

At the beginning of the 20th century into early 1930s, Kentucky colonels began to come together to form sociopolitical, charitable, and fraternal organizations. Newspaper reports from the time show that more than 20 organizations had formed with some organizations having sub-groups. 

During this time Kentucky colonelcy gained considerable attention as a desirable honorific title that was even being awarded to women, until being harshly ridiculed and called a hollow title by Marsh Henry also known as Col. Henry Watterson, who had been a Kentucky Colonel for over 30 years already in 1920. In 1931 in Las Vegas a well-read story about Kentucky colonels emerged, "Thousand New Kunnels, Suh, In 25 Years". Prior to 1932, only about 1,000 people had received official "Honorable" commissions as Kentucky colonels from Kentucky's governors. Governor Ruby Laffoon, in office from 1931 to 1935, dramatically increased the number of colonels by issuing more than 10,000 commissions in 1933 and 1934; among his motives was officializing the Kentucky colonel to identify with the Commonwealth, taxing the title of colonel, and boosting his own political support. One of his most famous colonelships was granted to restaurateur Harland Sanders, who was commissioned by Laffoon in 1935. Laffoon, alongside his aide Colonel Anna Bell Ward, selected many notable members of Kentucky society as well as Shirley Temple, Mickey Mouse and Santa Claus. Laffoon's helped connect the idea of the Kentucky Colonel to the state and the Kentucky Derby and helped bring  prominence to the Kentucky Derby by inviting celebrities and heads of state. 

When Governor Albert Benjamin Chandler (better known as Happy Chandler) took office in 1935, he took a very different view on the distinction of a Kentucky colonel commission and only issued about a dozen new commissions annually, on Derby Day. Governor Keen Johnson followed Governor Chandler's lead during his time in office from 1939 to 1943, commissioning only those select individuals who were deemed to have exhibited exceptionally noteworthy accomplishments and outstanding service to a community, state or the nation. The subsequent governors, however, have typically been much more liberal in issuing Kentucky colonel commissions.

Talking about their known history in 1941 the Honorable Order of Kentucky Colonels stated, "A.O. Stanley, then Governor, commissioned 110 honorary colonels; Gov. E.P. Morrow added 243; Gov. W. Fields, 183; Gov. Flem Sampson, 677; Gov. Ruby Laffoon, 10,450; and Gov. A.B. Chandler, 85. In 1934, at a meeting of Kentucky Colonels a social organization of colonels was affected. Then on March 28, 1936, the Attorney General of Kentucky voided all of these commissions, but a month later they were revived by the Acting Governor, James. E. Wise."

Contemporary Kentucky colonelcy 
Although commissioned Kentucky colonels are considered in Common Law to be aides-de-camp to the governors and members of their staff and thus entitled to the style of "Honorable", Kentucky colonels are usually just referred to and addressed as "Colonel" and use the abbreviation "Col." or Kentucky colonel when the term is not being used as a specific title for an individual. Most properly in writing this becomes "Col. First Name, Middle, Surname, Kentucky Colonel".

Increasing number of Kentucky colonels 
Under Governor Steve Beshear in 2008, so many commissions were being issued that state budget cuts led to a major change in the design of the commission certificate, as the governor was issuing as many as 16,500 colonelships per year. The wording remained the same on the certificate; however, the traditional gold seal and ribbon were replaced with a state seal that is embossed. Reducing materials for the new certificates was expected to save $5,000 annually for the state; the substantial savings was for excluding the labor formerly needed to apply the gold seal and ribbon by hand. The Honorable Order of Kentucky Colonels offered to pay $5,000 a year to keep the traditional certificates but the office of the Secretary of State decided to proceed due to the labor savings. 

Col. Russ Marlowe, a 70-year-old Bardstown resident, estimated that he had personally nominated about 500 recipients (mostly military veterans) and that none of his nominations had ever been turned down. John Carbone, a man from Philadelphia who later became a humorist in Kentucky, said that shortly after moving to the state in 1995, he struck up a casual conversation with a stranger while standing in line at a muffin shop, and was soon surprised to receive a Kentucky colonel certificate in the mail, as the man he had spoken with had been a member of the governor's staff and had submitted his name for the award. In a 2008 news article on the subject, a reporter wrote of preparing for writing it by asking some friends and family if they knew anyone who was a Kentucky colonel and being surprised to find that at least a dozen were colonels themselves, and then quipped to the reader, "You’re not a Kentucky Colonel? Actually, neither am I. But sometimes it seems like everybody else is. ...". About one third of all Kentucky colonels nominated in 2008 were Kentuckians.

Recent controversy among colonels 
In 2016, Governor Matt Bevin briefly suspended the program to conduct a review of the requirements for receiving the title and then changed the nomination process so that "only active members of the Honorable Order of Kentucky Colonels" were allowed to make recommendations for the honor. Up to that point in time, the longstanding practice had been that recommendations could be submitted by anyone who already was a Kentucky colonel, without any requirement for donations or membership in any particular organization, and at least 85,000 people had received the title. 

In 2019, the unincorporated fraternal membership organization Kentucky Colonels International raised concerns and harsh criticism over the changes instituted by Governor Bevin, saying that the commission is a lifetime appointment as an honorary award and should not require colonels to donate annually to a particular organization in order to make nominations and retain their status or privileges. Sherry Crose, executive director of the HOKC, confirmed that there was a donation component to the nomination process under Governor Bevin, but said the HOKC does not control the criteria for the nomination process, which is a matter under the discretion of the sitting governor. She said "The entire nomination process is handled by the governor. We have no say in how it's done."

With the change in the state's government in 2019 the Kentucky Colonels International commissioner wrote to the Governor, published a website and a series of articles advocating the salvation of the honorable title to the standards used under the previous governors and criticizing the current standards. The organization also attempted to develop a new membership program for Kentucky colonels, citing the lack of members voting rights in the Honorable Order. This placed the Honorable Order of Kentucky Colonels on the offensive and prompted them to file for trademark registration to protect their brand name ideas using the term "Kentucky Colonels ® ___" followed by the filing of a Federal lawsuit in the U.S. District Court for the Western District of Kentucky. The lawsuit alleged trademark infringement and unfair competition, but the matter was settled by the parties with an Agreed Permanent Injunction voluntarily entered into prior to answering all the questions it raised based on the organizations' past histories together and the history of the Kentucky colonel which was presented to the Court.

The nomination process changed around the same time the lawsuit began in February 2020, under Governor Andy Beshear. Beshear had the nomination process frozen starting on December 10, 2019. On February 19, 2020, Governor Beshear not only removed the donation requirement, but also removed the requirement that the nominators be among those previously designated as Kentucky Colonels. Beshear began allowing nominations to be submitted by anyone among the general public through a website form which requires that the person's qualifications are declared and well-elaborated prior to being considered for a Kentucky colonelcy.

Kentucky colonel organizations
Today there are a number of charitable, fraternal, and social organizations around the world that are either dedicated to, show deference to, or provide fellowship to Kentucky colonels. The social formation of these organizations created by those who have received the title has been facilitated by the use of social media allowing new alliances, fellowships and chapters to be created. There are currently organized fellowships (civil societies) located in the United Kingdom,  Philadelphia, Switzerland, Spain, New York City, Toronto, Germany, and several other places. Such groups have sometimes teamed together to support humanitarian causes like tornado disaster relief in Kentucky in 2012 and in Oklahoma in 2013. This has resulted in individuals working to generate goodwill towards the state of Kentucky and further recognition of the honorary title.

Honorable Order of Kentucky Colonels

The Honorable Order of Kentucky Colonels (HOKC) was first established during the depression in 1933 by Governor Ruby Laffoon as a state order of merit with an office at the capital. In 1957, it was incorporated as a nonprofit dedicated to building playgrounds, curating history, awarding scholarships and providing relief to Kentuckians in need. 

After a person receives a commission from the governor they automatically become an honorary lifetime member of the organization and, via donation to and participation in the HOKC's charitable efforts throughout the state they can be considered an active member.

Kentucky colonel toast
In 1936, New York advertising agency owner, Kentucky colonel Arthur Kudner, wrote a toast to Kentucky colonels. The toast was quickly adopted by the HOKC, and it was widely promoted and published for use by colonels. The toast has since been ceremoniously presented at each of the Kentucky Colonels' Derby Eve Banquets:

Kentucky colonel culture 
Starting around 1889, culture began incorporating the idea of the Kentucky Colonel as the name or part of the name of bars, beer, bourbon, barbecue, burgoo, clubs, hotels, food, liquor stores, plants, restaurants, social venues, sports teams, tobacco products and even a political lobby. The Kentucky Colonel has always been most notorious for drinking bourbon, making moonshine liquor, storytelling and dueling over their honor starting in the 19th century. Likewise the Kentucky colonel has been portrayed in a number of films, cartoons, movies, books and featured in newspapers since as early as the 1850s. 

Those who have received a Kentucky colonelcy commission have often used the title, idea or the image of the concept of the idealistic Kentucky Colonel to promote art, business, events, music, places and recreational activities while simultaneously promoting the state's customs and traditions, resulting in the honor becoming a well-recognized trademark of Kentucky's culture. As it was explained by the defense in the U.S. District Court in 2020, "the idea and image of the Kentucky Colonel and Kentucky colonels is inextricably intertwined with the state". 

Examples of the concept of the Kentucky Colonel being used to promote a product or idea include:
Colonel G.W. Gist built the first modern hotel in Tulsa, Oklahoma, called the Kentucky Colonel Hotel, in 1903.
Col. Matt Winn was present at the first race at Churchill Downs in 1875 and helped to turn it into the Kentucky Derby.
The 1960s band Kentucky Colonels was a bluegrass which included Clarence White (later with The Byrds).
A wide range of memorabilia has been created for sale or recognition including by the Honorable Order of Kentucky Colonels.
A number of sports teams in Kentucky, have been known as the Kentucky Colonels including the Kentucky Colonels professional basketball team of 1967–1976, the Kentucky Colonels professional basketball team of 2004, and the Eastern Kentucky Colonels athletic teams of Eastern Kentucky University. The athletic teams from Centre College in Danville are also known as the Colonels.
Harland David Sanders (1890 – 1980) used his title of "Colonel" and his own personal determination to make himself and Kentucky world-famous for fried chicken. From a gas station in Corbin, Kentucky, Colonel Sanders (as he became known) started the fast food franchise Kentucky Fried Chicken, known today as KFC. He became so well known, both nationally and internationally, that he was often referred to simply as "The Colonel", which is also the title of a book that was written about his life.

Bourbon whiskey 
The Kentucky colonel title in business marketing is seen in the ongoing historic association between Kentucky and bourbon whiskey production. As of 2013, approximately 95 percent of all bourbon was produced in Kentucky, and the state had 4.9 million barrels of bourbon in the process of aging. The historic distiller James B. Beam is referred to as "Colonel James B. Beam" for the marketing of the Jim Beam brand (the largest-selling brand of bourbon). The Sazerac Company similarly refers to the distiller Albert Blanton as "Colonel Blanton" for their marketing of the Blanton's brand. In both cases, the "Colonel" title refers to being a Kentucky colonel. A brand of Kentucky bourbon called Kentucky Colonel was produced in the 1980s, and at least two current brands of Kentucky bourbon have the word "Colonel" in their name, the Colonel E. H. Taylor and Colonel Lee bourbon brands. In 2020 the Neeley Family Distillery (a craft bourbon distiller) in Sparta, Kentucky filed for the trademark "Old Kentucky Colonel" to bring back the original Kentucky Colonel brand.

Kentucky colonel nominations 
Each governor decides the selection process and number of colonelcies that are issued. The process has previously required a nomination from another colonel or direct recognition by the governor but, under the process established by Governor Andy Beshear, nominations and recommendations for other people can be submitted by both Kentucky colonels and members of the general public by completing a form detailing "any active or previous service in a charitable organization or community service and/or any military service", and a statement of the "noteworthy deed" that qualifies them.

See also

Goodwill Ambassador
Arkansas Traveler
Colonel (U.S. honorary title)
Nebraska Admiral
Order of the Long Leaf Pine (of North Carolina)
Order of the Palmetto (of South Carolina)
Rhode Island Commodore
Sagamore of the Wabash (of Indiana)

References

Citations

General bibliography 
 Carl Edwin Lindgren. "Honorable Order of Kentucky Colonels" (February/March 2001). Il Mondo del Cavaliere, Vol. I, No. 1, p. 14. .

External links

 Commonwealth of Kentucky
 Kentucky Colonels at the Office of the Governor
 Kentucky Colonels Membership
 Honorable Order of Kentucky Colonels
 Kentucky Colonelcy Creative Commons
 American Colonels: Kentucky Colonelcy

1895 establishments in Kentucky

Awards established in 1895
State awards and decorations of the United States
Governor of Kentucky
Honorary titles of the United States
Kentucky culture
Kentucky militia